Robert Peapo "Peabo" Bryson (born April 13, 1951) is an American singer and songwriter. He is known for singing soul ballads (often as a duet with female singers) including the 1983 hit "Tonight, I Celebrate My Love" with Roberta Flack. Bryson has contributed to two Disney animated feature soundtracks. Bryson is a winner of two Grammy Awards.

Early years and career
Born Robert Peapo Bryson in Greenville, South Carolina, Peabo Bryson spent much of his childhood on his grandfather's farm in Mauldin, South Carolina. His love for music stemmed from his mother, who often took the family to concerts of well-known African-American artists at the time.

Bryson marked his professional debut at age 14, singing backup for Al Freeman and the Upsetters, a local Greenville group. It was Freeman's difficulty in pronouncing Bryson's French West-Indian name, Peapo, that led Bryson to perform as Peabo. Two years later, he left home to tour the Chitlin' Circuit with another local band, Moses Dillard and the Tex-Town Display. Bryson's first break came during a recording session at Atlanta's Bang Records. Although Bang was not impressed with Dillard's band, the young backup singer caught the ear of the label's general manager, Eddie Biscoe. Biscoe signed Bryson to a contract as a writer, producer, and arranger and encouraged Bryson to perform his own songs. For several years, Bryson worked with hometown bands and wrote and produced for Bang. In 1976, he launched his own recording career with "Underground Music" on the Bang label. His first album, Peabo, followed shortly thereafter. Although only a regional success, Bryson signed to Capitol Records in 1977.

Bryson's greatest solo hits include 1977's "Feel the Fire" and "Reaching for the Sky", 1978's "I'm So into You" and "Crosswinds", 1982's "Let the Feeling Flow", 1984's "If Ever You're in My Arms Again" (his first Top 10 pop single, at No. 10 in the US), 1989's "Show and Tell", and the 1991 hit "Can You Stop the Rain". In 1985, he appeared on the soap opera One Life to Live to sing a lyrical version of its theme song. Bryson's vocals were added to the regular theme song in 1986 and his voice was heard daily until 1992. He recorded the successful album of romantic love duets with Roberta Flack (Born to Love) in 1983. In partnership with Regina Belle, Bryson recorded two hit duets: "Without You", the love theme from the comedy film Leonard Part 6, recorded in 1987 and "A Whole New World", the main theme of the Disney's animated feature film Aladdin, recorded in 1992. Bryson and Belle recorded four duets over the years: "Without You" (in 1987), "I Can't Imagine" (in 1991), "A Whole New World" (in 1992) and "Total Praise" (in 2009).

Among his romantic love songs and duets are:

 "Gimme Some Time", with Natalie Cole
 "What You Won't Do for Love", with Natalie Cole
 "Here We Go", with Minnie Riperton
 "Lovers After All", with Melissa Manchester
 "Tonight I Celebrate My Love", with Roberta Flack
 "You're Lookin' Like Love to Me", with Roberta Flack
 "I Just Came Here to Dance", with Roberta Flack
 "There's Nothin' Out There", with Chaka Khan
 "Without You", with Regina Belle (theme from Leonard Part 6)
 "For You and I" with Angela Bofill
 "Beauty and the Beast", with Celine Dion (theme from Beauty and the Beast)
 "I Can't Imagine", with Regina Belle
 "A Whole New World", with Regina Belle (theme from Aladdin)
 "You Are My Home", with Linda Eder (theme from The Scarlet Pimpernel)
 "By the Time This Night Is Over", with Kenny G
 "Light the World", with Deborah Gibson
 "The Gift", with Roberta Flack
 "Wishes", with Kimberley Locke (for the album Disney Wishes!)
 "The Best Part", with Nadia Gifford
 "As Long As There's Christmas", with Roberta Flack (theme from Beauty and the Beast: The Enchanted Christmas)
 "I Have Dreamed", with Lea Salonga (theme from The King and I)
 "How Wonderful We Are", with Lea Salonga (for the album People: A Musical Celebration Of Diversity)
 "Make It Til Tomorrow", with Sandi Patty

Bryson won two Grammy Awards: in 1992 for his performance of the song "Beauty and the Beast" with Celine Dion and in 1993 for "A Whole New World" with Regina Belle.

In early 1998, Bryson contributed his voice to Barney's Great Adventure: An Original Motion Picture Musical Soundtrack, with the song "Dream (Twinken's Tune)".

Bryson performed in theater and operatic productions, most notably the tenor role of "Sportin' Life" in the Michigan Opera Theater of Detroit's version of Porgy and Bess. His tax problems caught up with him on August 21, 2003, when the U.S. Internal Revenue Service seized property from his Atlanta, Georgia, home. He is reported to owe $1.2 million in taxes dating back to 1984. The IRS auctioned many of his possessions, including both Grammy Awards, electronic equipment, his grand piano and multiple pairs of shoes.

In 2002, Bryson's "Beauty and the Beast" music video was included on the platinum and Blu-ray edition of Beauty and the Beast. His "A Whole New World" music video was included on the platinum edition DVD release of Aladdin. Bryson's CD, Missing You, was released on October 2, 2007 on Peak Records, a division of Concord Music Group.

September 4, 2016 was declared "Peabo Bryson Day" in Charleston, South Carolina and North Charleston, South Carolina, during the LowCountryJazzFest. The annual jazzfest is presented by ClosingTheGapInHealthCare.org, founded by Dr. Thaddeus Bell.

In 2018, Bryson released his new album Stand For Love, which was produced by Jimmy Jam and Terry Lewis. The project was released on Jam & Lewis' newly reactivated label, Perspective Records.

Personal life
Before marrying his present wife, singer and member of English R&B group The 411 Tanya Boniface, Bryson was engaged several times to Juanita Leonard, the former wife of boxing great Sugar Ray Leonard. In the 1990s, he became engaged to Angela Thigpen, former Miss Virginia Teen USA and later a model/actress. Bryson and Boniface have a son, Robert, born January 1, 2018.

Bryson also has a daughter, Linda (born c. 1968), from a previous relationship, along with three grandchildren.

Tax problems caught up with Bryson on August 21, 2003, when the U.S. Internal Revenue Service seized property from his Atlanta, Georgia, home. He is reported to have owed $1.2 million in taxes dating back to 1984. The IRS auctioned many of his possessions, including both Grammy Awards, electronic equipment, his grand piano and multiple pairs of shoes. However, his Grammy for "A Whole New World (Aladdin's Theme)" was purchased by a close friend of the family who vowed to return it to Bryson.

On April 29, 2019, it was reported that Bryson had suffered a heart attack, and had been taken to Atlanta hospital where he was said to be in a stable condition. He has since made a full recovery.

Discography

Studio albums
Peabo (1976)
Reaching for the Sky (1977)
Crosswinds (1978)
We're the Best of Friends with Natalie Cole (1979)
Paradise (1980)
Turn the Hands of Time (1981)
I Am Love (1981)
Don't Play with Fire (1982)
Born to Love with Roberta Flack (1983)
Straight from the Heart (1984)
Take No Prisoners (1985)
Quiet Storm (1986)
Positive (1988)
All My Love (1989)
Can You Stop the Rain (1991)
Through the Fire (1994)
Peace on Earth (1997)
Unconditional Love (1999)
Missing You (2007)
Stand for Love (2018)

References

External links
 Video of "Without You" as performed at the Soul Train: .
 The official music video of "A Whole New World": .
 The official music video of "Beauty and The Beast": .
 [ AllMusic entry]
 Peabo Bryson at Wenig-LaMonica Associates
 Fan Page

1951 births
20th-century American singers
21st-century American keyboardists
African-American male singers
African-American record producers
American male singer-songwriters
American rhythm and blues keyboardists
American rhythm and blues singer-songwriters
American soul keyboardists
American soul singers
American tenors
Capitol Records artists
Columbia Records artists
Grammy Award winners
Walt Disney Records artists
Living people
Musicians from Greenville, South Carolina
Record producers from South Carolina
People from Mauldin, South Carolina
Ballad musicians
20th-century American male singers
21st-century American male singers
21st-century American singers
20th-century American keyboardists
African-American songwriters
Singer-songwriters from South Carolina